The premier of the Northwest Territories is the first minister and head of government for the Canadian territory of the Northwest Territories. The premier is the territory's head of government, although the powers of the office are considerably less than those of a provincial premier.

Unlike provincial premiers, who are appointed by a lieutenant-governor or commissioner on the basis of their leadership of a majority bloc in the legislature, the premier of the Northwest Territories is elected, along with the Cabinet, by the non-partisan members of the territory's Legislative Assembly, in accordance with the system of consensus government, and then appointed by the commissioner of the Northwest Territories.

Before 1994, the term "government leader" was officially used instead of "premier," but the title of premier was later retroactively applied to government leaders starting with George Braden in 1980, and had been in informal use for several years, based on the historical precedent set by Frederick W. A. G. Haultain, who used the title of premier of the North West Territories from 1897 to 1905 .

The current premier of the Northwest Territories is Caroline Cochrane, since October 24, 2019.

See also
 Prime Minister of Canada
 List of premiers of the Northwest Territories

References

External links
 Office of the Premier (Government of the NWT)